Huda Smitshuijzen AbiFarès is a typographer, writer, researcher, graphic designer, lecturer, and design consultant from Beirut, Lebanon. She is the founder and director of the Khatt Foundation. As a designer and researcher, she specializes in Arabic and multilingual typography.

Biography 
Huda AbiFarès was born in Beirut in 1965.

She studied in the United States, earning a bachelor of fine arts degree in graphic design from Rhode Island School of Design in 1987, and a master of fine arts degree from Yale University in 1990.

When working as an assistant professor of graphic design at the American University of Beirut, she determined that the literature necessary to teach her students about Arabic script, calligraphy, and typography had not yet been written. In 2001, she published Arabic Typography, in which she examined Arabic typography from a structural and theoretical point of view.

She also taught visual communication at the American University in Dubai and served as the department's chair for 3 years.

She founded the non-profit Khatt Foundation for the advancement of Arabic typography in Amsterdam in 2004.

In 2016, she became a member of Alliance Graphique Internationale.

She earned a PhD in Middle Eastern studies from Leiden University in 2017.

She resides in the Netherlands.

Works 
 Arabic Typography: a comprehensive sourcebook (Saqi Books, London, 2001)
 Experimental Arabic Type (Saatchi & Saatchi, Dubai, 2002)
 Typographic Matchmaking (BIS Publishers, Amsterdam 2007)
 Typographic Matchmaking in the City (Khatt Books, Amsterdam 2011)
 Arabic Type Design for Beginners (Khatt Books, Amsterdam 2013)

References 

Typographers and type designers
Writers from Beirut
Rhode Island School of Design alumni
Yale University alumni
Leiden University alumni
1965 births
Living people
Artists from Beirut
Typographers of Arabic script
Lebanese graphic designers